Isabelle Diaz Daza-Semblat (born March 6, 1988) is a Filipino actress, television host and model. She is the daughter of Miss Universe 1969 titleholder, Gloria Diaz. She was a member of GMA Network's roster of young talents and was introduced to the mass media entertainment audiences during a dance number on the noontime show Party Pilipinas on April 17, 2011. On November 24, 2014, Daza transferred to ABS-CBN and signed a two-year exclusive contract. She gained recognition for her role in the drama series Tubig at Langis.

Early life
Isabelle Daza is the daughter of Gloria Diaz, the Miss Universe 1969 titleholder, and Gabriel "Bong" Daza III, a restaurateur and former Makati city councilor. Her grandmother is chef Nora Daza. She has an older brother and a younger sister, Ava. Her parents separated when she was seven years old; however, they remained good friends.

In 2010, she earned her bachelor's degree in early childhood education from De La Salle University.

Career
Daza started her career in 2005 as a print and ramp model.

After graduating from De La Salle University, she worked as a preschool teacher. She signed a contract with GMA Network Center with her manager, Leo Domingez, and made her debut on Party Pilipinas. In an interview with The Philippine Star, Daza admits that she is still trying to "figure out" her career in acting and she is continuously taking workshops, but her main interest is in hosting. Her first attempt in TV hosting was on a game show with boxing champion Manny Pacquiao, entitled Show Me Da Manny (later renamed Manny Many Prizes.) On August 2, 2011, Daza was launched as the New Face of Sophie Paris Philippines. In late December 2011, Daza joined the longest-running noontime show Eat Bulaga! where she later became a regular co-host.

In 2014, Daza signed a two-year exclusive contract with ABS-CBN. She appeared in the 2015 fantasy drama series Nathaniel starring Marco Masa. She eventually became popular for her major role as Clara in the 2016 melodrama series Tubig at Langis with Cristine Reyes and Zanjoe Marudo. Later on, Daza continues to collaborate with Marudo in the 2018 romantic comedy series Playhouse (with Angelica Panganiban and JJ Quilantang) and for an episode in the drama anthology Maalaala Mo Kaya.

Personal life
In February 2016, Daza confirmed her engagement with French businessman Adrien Semblat, her boyfriend for seven years. The couple married on September 10, 2016 at the San Francesco Church in Tuscany, Italy. The wedding was officiated by Daza's uncle Fr. Fidel Orendain. Accordingly, it was her godfather, former senator Bongbong Marcos, who walked her down the aisle on her wedding day. Marcos was the bestfriend of her father, Gabriel "Bong" Daza III, who had died on July 14 that year.

On April 1, 2018, Daza gave birth to her first child. In December 2020, Daza announced that she and Semblat were expecting their second child. Her second child was born on 9 April, 2021.

As of 2020, Daza and her family live in Hong Kong, having moved there due to her husband's job as vice-president of Adidas and Reebok's Hong Kong and Macau branches.

Filmography

Television

Film

Awards and nominations

References

External links
 

1988 births
Living people
Filipino film actresses
Filipino television actresses
Filipino female models
Filipino television variety show hosts
Actresses from Manila
Viva Artists Agency
De La Salle University alumni
GMA Network personalities
ABS-CBN personalities
Star Magic
TV5 (Philippine TV network) personalities